The 2012 Polish Masters was an exhibition international club football (soccer) competition featuring football club teams from Europe, which was held in July 2012. All matches were played in Stadion Miejski in Wrocław, Poland. This was the first Polish Masters.

Teams 
The following four clubs participated in the 2012 tournament:

 Śląsk Wrocław 
 PSV Eindhoven 
 Athletic Bilbao 
 S.L. Benfica

Matches
July 20 during a press conference with coaches and players of all teams was draw for the semi-final pairs. The winners will play in the finals and the loser of the match for 3rd place.

Semi-finals

Third-place

Final

Top scores

2 goals
  Georginio Wijnaldum (PSV Eindhoven)
  Carlos Martins (Benfica)

1 goal
  Rok Elsner (Śląsk Wrocław)
  Waldemar Sobota (Śląsk Wrocław)
  Óscar Cardozo (Benfica)
  Luisão (Benfica)
  Nicolás Gaitán (Benfica)
  Markel Susaeta (Athletic Bilbao)
  Mathias Jørgensen (PSV Eindhoven)
  Jeremain Lens (PSV Eindhoven)

The topscorer of the 2012 Polish Masters was Carlos Martins, because he played fewer minutes than Georginio Wijnaldum.

References

External links
 Official website
 Polish Masters Tournament 2012 at Rec.Sport.Soccer Statistics Foundation

International club association football competitions hosted by Poland
2012–13 in Portuguese football
2012–13 in Polish football
2012–13 in Dutch football
2012–13 in Spanish football